"Tell Me When" is a song by British group the Applejacks, released as their debut single in February 1964. It became their only top-ten hit, peaking at number seven on the Record Retailer chart.

Background and release
"Tell Me When" was written by Les Reed and Geoff Stephens. On the suggestion of publisher and producer Frank Poser, Stephens teamed up with Les Reed, with neither having yet written a hit song. After being played part of a tune Reed had written, Stephens thought that the words 'tell me when' fitted exactly. The phrase, used when pouring a drink, was applied metaphorically in the song to refer to a relationship, i.e. per the lyrics 'tell me when you're ready to be mine'. 

Recorded at Decca Studios in January 1964, it was released as a single a month later with the B-side "Baby Jane", written by Pete Dello and Ray Cane, who would go on to form Honeybus and have their own hit "I Can't Let Maggie Go".

Personnel
 Al Jackson – lead vocals
 Martin Baggott – lead guitar
 Phil Cash – rhythm guitar
 Megan Davies – bass guitar
 Don Gould – organ
 Gerry Freeman – drums

Charts

References

1964 singles
1964 songs
Songs written by Les Reed (songwriter)
Songs written by Geoff Stephens
Decca Records singles
Song recordings produced by Mike Smith (British record producer)